The 110th Infantry Regiment is a regiment of the United States Army. Its legacy unit, 1st Battalion, 110th Infantry, is a subordinate command of 2nd Brigade, 28th Infantry Division.

The regiment served with the 55th Infantry Brigade, 28th Infantry Division from September 1917 – May 1919, and from 1921–24.
 Organized and federally recognized 8 June 1921 in the Pennsylvania National Guard at Washington, Pennsylvania as Headquarters Company, 1st Battalion, 110th Infantry, an element of the 28th Division (later redesignated as the 28th Infantry Division).
 Inducted into federal service 17 February 1941 at Washington.
 Based in Pembrokeshire, Wales from October 1943 to April 1944, preparing for D-Day; a memorial to those lost in the liberation of Europe was unveiled in 2019.
 Inactivated 25 October 1945 at Camp Shelby, Mississippi.
 Reorganized and federally recognized 12 December 1946 at Washington as Headquarters Company, 110th Infantry.
 Ordered into active federal service 5 September 1950 at Washington.
 Headquarters Company, 110th Infantry [NGUS], organized and federally recognized 16 July 1953 at Washington.
 Released from active federal service 15 June 1954 and reverted to state control; federal recognition concurrently withdrawn from Headquarters Company, 110th Infantry (NGUS).
 Reorganized and redesignated 1 June 1959 as Headquarters Company, 1st Battle Group, 110th Infantry.
Current reorganization as of March 2014
 Home Station: Mount Pleasant, Pennsylvania
 Company A – Indiana, Pennsylvania
 Company B – Waynesburg, Pennsylvania
 Company C – Connellsville, Pennsylvania
 Company D – Greensburg, Pennsylvania

In June 2016, 1st Battalion-110th Infantry Regiment deployed to Jordan, UAE, and Kuwait to train their forces.

Notable members
Thomas S. Crago (1866–1925), member of the U.S. House of Representatives
Joseph H. Thompson (1871–1928), Medal of Honor recipient, Pennsylvania State Senator, and member of the College Football Hall of Fame

References

External links
History of the 110th Infantry (10th Pa.) of the 28th Division, U.S.A., 1917–1919

Infantry regiments of the United States Army National Guard
Military units and formations in Pennsylvania
110
Military units and formations established in 1873